Olav Gutting (born 14 October 1970) is a German lawyer and politician of the Christian Democratic Union (CDU) who has been serving as a member of the Bundestag since 2014.

Early life and education
Gutting was born 1970 in the West German town of Bruchsal and studied jurisprudence at the University of Mannheim.

Political career
In 2001 Gutting entered the CDU and became already in 2002 nominee of his party in the electoral ward of Bruchsal – Schwetzingen. He has been a member of the Bundestag since the 2002 elections, representing Bruchsal – Schwetzingen.

In parliament, Gutting has been serving on the Finance Committee. In this capacity, he is his parliamentary group’s rapporteur on the so-called solidarity surcharge ( or ). 

Within the CDU/CSU parliamentary group, Gutting has been part of the leadership since 2013, under successive chairmen Volker Kauder (2013-2018) and Ralph Brinkhaus (since 2018). He was one of the MPs who voted for Brinkhaus to oust Kauder in 2018. Later that year, he ran for the post of deputy chairman but lost against Andreas Jung.

Other activities
 Nuclear Waste Disposal Fund (KENFO), Member of the Board of Trustees (since 2022)
 KfW, Member of the Board of Supervisory Directors (since 2019)
 German Association for Small and Medium-Sized Businesses (BVMW), Member of the Political Advisory Board (since 2022)

Political positions
Within the CDU, Gutting is regarded as critic of Chancellor Angela Merkel's decision to enter into a coalition government with the center-left Social Democratic Party (SPD) after the 2017 elections. In June 2017, he voted against Germany's introduction of same-sex marriage. In early 2020, he co-founded an informal cross-party group of MPs from the CDU, CSU and FDP parties who opposed a potential coalition government between CDU/CSU and the Green Party.

Ahead of the Christian Democrats’ leadership election, Gutting publicly endorsed in 2020 Friedrich Merz to succeed Annegret Kramp-Karrenbauer as the party's chair; he later also expressed support for a candidacy of Jens Spahn.

Controversy 
In March 2021, Gutting and other members of the Union parliamentary group came under criticism for their lobbying activities for the authoritarian Azerbaijani president Ilham Aliyev. The controversy became known under the name of "Aserbaidschan-Affäre" in Germany and is related to the earlier "Caviar Diplomacy" corruption allegations in the Council of Europe.

References

1970 births
Living people
People from Bruchsal
Members of the Bundestag for Lower Saxony
Members of the Bundestag 2021–2025
Members of the Bundestag 2017–2021
Members of the Bundestag 2013–2017
Members of the Bundestag 2009–2013
Members of the Bundestag 2005–2009
Members of the Bundestag 2002–2005
Members of the Bundestag for the Christian Democratic Union of Germany